The 2011–12 Bangladeshi cricket season is when the increase in the National Cricket League (NCL) championship teams from six to eight. Following creation of Rangpur Division in January 2010 as the country's seventh administrative region, the NCL in 2011–12 was expanded to eight teams with the introduction of the Rangpur team and the return of Dhaka Metropolis, although they had no settled home venue. Rajshahi Division won the championship title in the fourth consecutive season. The One Day League was formally terminated before the season began and the main List A limited overs competition since then is the Dhaka Premier Division, which began in 2013–14. The Bangladesh Premier League (BPL) was founded in 2011–12 season and Dhaka Gladiators were its first champions.

Honours
 National Cricket League – Rajshahi Division
 Bangladesh Premier League – Dhaka Gladiators
 Most runs – Anamul Haque (Khulna) 816 @ 42.94
 Most wickets – Enamul Haque (Sylhet) 59 @ 22.52

International cricket

The West Indies toured Bangladesh in October 2011 and playing two Test matches, the West Indies winning the second, the first being a drawn game. West Indies played three limited overs internationals, winning the series 2–1. Bangladesh won a T20I by 3 wickets.

Pakistan toured from 29 November to 21 December 2011, playing one Twenty20 International (T20I), three One Day Internationals (ODIs) and two Test matches, Pakistan winning all matches.

See also
 History of cricket in Bangladesh

References

Further reading
 Wisden Cricketers' Almanack 2012

External links
 Miscellaneous articles re Bangladesh cricket
 CricInfo re Bangladesh
 CricketArchive re tournaments in Bangladesh in 2011–12

2011 in Bangladeshi cricket
2012 in Bangladeshi cricket
Bangladeshi cricket seasons from 2000–01
Domestic cricket competitions in 2011–12